The Nutcracker in 3D (also released The Nutcracker: The Untold Story) is a 2010 3D Christmas musical fantasy film adapted from Pyotr Ilyich Tchaikovsky’s 1892 ballet The Nutcracker. Directed, co-written, and produced by Andrei Konchalovsky, the film stars Elle Fanning, Nathan Lane, John Turturro, Frances de la Tour, Richard E. Grant and Yulia Vysotskaya, with Charlie Rowe and Shirley Henderson as the Nutcracker. Set in 1920s Vienna, the plot follows a young girl who receives a magical doll that is revealed to be a prince and embarks on an adventure to save his kingdom from the Rat King.

The film was panned by critics upon its release, and was criticized for its story, deviations from the ballet, performances, twisted visuals, the decision to adapt Tchaikovsky’s score into lyrical musical numbers, and the allusions to World War II, Nazism, and the Holocaust. It was a box office bomb, grossing $20 million against a $90 million budget.

Plot
In 1920s Vienna during the Christmas season, Mary lives with her parents and her younger brother Max. She is upset that her parents are going to a party that night, as she wants the whole family to be together for Christmas. Uncle Albert arrives and gives both her and Max a dollhouse and a nutcracker doll nicknamed NC, whom Mary immediately takes a liking to. That night, NC comes to life in front of Mary and grows to human height. He tells her that he must talk to his friends in the doll house, which is in the sitting room by the Christmas tree. They go downstairs and Mary finds that the sitting room has grown to an enormous size so that they appear to be the height of toys. In the dollhouse, Mary meets NCs friends; Gielgud, a gentlemanly chimpanzee; Tinker, a pernickety opera singer and Sticks, a drummer boy.

After climbing the Christmas tree, Mary meets the Snow Fairy, who resembles her mother. The Snow Fairy tells Mary that NC is in fact a prince who had his kingdom taken over by the anthropomorphic Rat King and his cruel mother, The Rat Queen, who was also the one that turned him into a nutcracker. She manages to turn him back into a boy temporarily due to Mary's belief and the two briefly dance before finding his city. Since NC was turned into a nutcracker, the Rat King has been oppressing his people, and forcing them to work in factories where the children's toys are burnt to form dark clouds over the city to block out sunlight, which he is afraid of. Mary suggests that they destroy the factories to scare him away. Unbeknownst to them, two of the Rat Kings spies report back to tell the Rat King that NC is alive and a boy again. The Rat Queen turns NC back into a nutcracker, then sends the Rat Dogs, a pack of robotic Rottweilers, to cut down the Christmas tree. When the tree falls, Mary suddenly wakes up in her own bed and runs downstairs to get NC. Her parents do not believe her when she tells them the events of the night.

The next evening, NC comes to life again and tells Mary that he intends to round up an army to fight against the Rat King. Max wakes up and agrees to join the fight with them. NC goes downstairs ahead of them, to gather his friends but is kidnapped. When Mary and Max go downstairs, they find that NC, Tinker and Sticks are being held captive in the fire place by the Rat King and his minions. After briefly tormenting them, he kidnaps the toys and lures Max back to the city. After they leave, Mary discovers Gielgud, who escaped capture. They find a portal to the city in the house's attic, and after stealing disguises from a rat, search the city for their friends. They find the Rat King and Max in the city centre where toys are being taken from children to be burned. Max is horrified by this and asks to be returned home, but the Rat King imprisons him in his castle. They sneak into one of the smoke factories where they find Sticks, Tinker and an apparently lifeless NC.

Mary rescues him from being burned and tells him that she loves him, which breaks the curse, bringing NC back to life and turning him back into a boy permanently. The factory workers, seeing their prince alive, begin to fight back against the rats while Mary and NC attempt to shut down the factory. The Rat King and Rat Queen decide to escape in a helicopter, kidnapping Mary and Max. Gielgud and NC manage to board the helicopter and fight the Rat King while Max successfully manages to land the aircraft into a pile of toys. The Rat King and Queen escape by returning to their original rat forms and fleeing into the sewers. NC is crowned king and peace is restored in the kingdom as everyone celebrates. The Snow Fairy reappears and tells Mary it is time for her to go back home, though she is reluctant to leave. Before she goes, NC promises that they will meet again.

Mary wakes up in her own room where her parents apologise for their earlier criticisms of her and promise to spend more time with her. She goes downstairs to Uncle Albert who introduces her to his new neighbour: a boy her age, who resembles the Nutcracker Prince and asks to be called NC. They soon become friends and the two go ice-skating together.

Cast

Production

Development
Director Konchalovsky stated that the film had been his "dream project" for over twenty years. He was inspired to adapt it into 3D for several reasons; he believed that the format would be useful in conveying the fantastical nature of the material, capturing the emotions of CGI characters, and appealing to a family audience. At the same time, he opted to adapt it with no ballet sequences because, according to him, "ballet cannot work in cinema very well." 

Konchalovsky gave the rats who try to take over the fantasy kingdom Nazi-like qualities in his production, one of the many elements in the adaptation which alienated both critics and audiences.

Financing
A 2022 article in Meduza reported that the film was primarily financed by VEB.RF, a Russian state development corporation chaired by Vladimir Putin, and that it was the most expensive Russian film made to date.

In December 2020, VEB filed a lawsuit against the producers for unpaid loans, totaling 127.8 million US dollars, claiming they had withheld proceeds from the film’s ticket sales.

Filming
The film was announced at the 2007 Cannes Film Festival and principal photography took place primarily in Budapest, Hungary that summer, before the set was moved to the Stern Film Studio in Pomáz.

Music
The film's score is derived from Tchaikovsky's original music for The Nutcracker, the ballet version of the E.T.A. Hoffmann story, and lyricist Tim Rice wrote lyrics for it. Many of the songs are based on the ballet's dances. Others are based on Tchaikovsky's other compositions, such as his Symphony No. 5 and Symphony No. 6.

Release
The film was first screened at the European Film Market on 5 February 2009. It was released in Hungary on 8 December 2012 and United Kingdom on 28 December 2012.

Box office
The film brought in a total of $20,466,016 worldwide (over half of which came from Russia), making it a box office bomb with a loss of $73,821,041.

Critical response
On Rotten Tomatoes, the film has a rare approval rating of 0%meaning no favorable reviews whatsoever, out of 32 reviews with an average rating of 2.96/10. The site's consensus reads: "Misguided, misconceived, and misbegotten on every level, The Nutcracker in 3D is a stunning exercise in astonishing cinematic wrong-headedness." On Metacritic it has a weighted average score of 18 out of 100 based on 18 reviews, indicating "overwhelming dislike". Metacritic later ranked it the "Worst Limited Release" film of 2010.

Roger Ebert of the Chicago Sun-Times gave it one out of four stars and asked, "From what dark night of the soul emerged the wretched idea for The Nutcracker in 3D?". Ebert went on to claim it as "One of those rare holiday movies that may send children screaming under their seats." Claudia Puig of USA Today accused the film of being "contrived, convoluted, amateurish and tedious," and panned it for lacking any trace of ballet, unlike several previous versions of The Nutcracker. Entertainment Weekly reviewer Lisa Schwarzbaum gave it its only positive review from a professional film critic, awarding it a B+ and remarking "Attention, university film clubs: Here's your cult-ready midnight-movie programming."

Accolades

See also
 List of biggest box-office bombs
 The Nutcracker

References

External links
 
 

2010 3D films
2010 films
British Christmas films
British musical fantasy films
Cultural depictions of Albert Einstein
English-language Hungarian films
English-language Russian films
Films about shapeshifting
Films based on The Nutcracker and the Mouse King
Films directed by Andrei Konchalovsky
Films scored by Eduard Artemyev
Films shot in Budapest
Hungarian fantasy films
Hungarian musical films
Russian fantasy films
Russian musical films
2010s Christmas films
2010s musical fantasy films
2010s British films
2010s English-language films
Works subject to a lawsuit
Casting controversies in film
Salary controversies in film
Film controversies in the United Kingdom